The Hopkins House in Marion, Louisiana was built as the home of Rev. Elias George, a Baptist Minister and cotton planter. It was built by an artisan slave named John Thomas in 1850.  Reverend George and his family occupied the until 1866 when he sold it to his daughter Susan and her husband Lewis M. Powell.  It was listed on the National Register of Historic Places in 1983.

It is significant at the state level as an example of Carolina I architecture.

References

Houses on the National Register of Historic Places in Louisiana
Houses completed in 1850
Union Parish, Louisiana